East Staffordshire Borough Council elections are held every four years. East Staffordshire is a non-metropolitan district with borough status in Staffordshire, England. Since the last boundary changes in 2003, 39 councillors have been elected from 21 wards. New ward boundaries have been prepared to take effect from the 2023 elections.

Political control
The first elections were held in 1973, initially operating as a shadow authority until the new arrangements came into effect on 1 April 1974. Political control of the council since 1974 has been held by the following parties:

Leadership
The leaders of the council since 2009 have been:

Council elections
1973 East Staffordshire District Council election
1976 East Staffordshire District Council election
1979 East Staffordshire District Council election (New ward boundaries)
1983 East Staffordshire District Council election
1987 East Staffordshire District Council election
1991 East Staffordshire District Council election (District boundary changes took place but the number of seats remained the same)
1995 East Staffordshire Borough Council election
1999 East Staffordshire Borough Council election
2003 East Staffordshire Borough Council election (New ward boundaries) 
2007 East Staffordshire Borough Council election
2011 East Staffordshire Borough Council election
2015 East Staffordshire Borough Council election
2019 East Staffordshire Borough Council election

By-election results

The by-election was triggered by the resignation of Councillor Steve Dyche

References

East Staffordshire election results
Local Authority Byelection Results

External links
East Staffordshire Borough Council

 
Elections in Staffordshire
Council elections in Staffordshire
District council elections in England